Ira (as surname) may refer to:
 Leo Ira (:ru) (born 1951), an Estonian football trainer and manager
  (1890s—1987), a Russian emigrant, White army officer, agent "Bureau Klatt" and Abwehr operative.

See also
 Ira (disambiguation)
 Ira (mythology)
 Ira (name)

Estonian-language surnames